The Major Division of the Rest of Barbuda is a major division used by the Antigua and Barbuda Statistics Department for statistical purposes.

Demographics 
The major division has 3 enumeration districts.

 90400 Barbuda South River Road
 90500 Barbuda-East
 90600 Barbuda-North

Census Data

References 

Major Divisions of Antigua and Barbuda
Major Division of Rest of Barbuda